WRRH (106.1 FM), branded on-air as Renacer 106.1 FM, is a radio station broadcasting a Contemporary Christian format. Licensed to Hormigueros, Puerto Rico, it serves the Puerto Rico area.  The station is currently owned by Renacer Broadcasters Corporation.

The call letter "WRRH" also refer to the radio station of the Ramapo-Indian Hills School District in Franklin Lakes-Oakland-Wyckoff, New Jersey until 1989.  It was a part-time, student-run radio station at 88.7 FM.

External links

Radio stations established in 1995
Hormigueros, Puerto Rico
Contemporary Christian radio stations in Puerto Rico
1995 establishments in Puerto Rico